Leszek Robert Blanik (born 1 March 1977 in Wodzisław Śląski) is a Polish gymnast, World and Olympic champion in vault. He was the first to perform a handspring double front vault in piked position which now has been named after him.

Olympics
Blanik picked up a bronze in vault at the 2000 Summer Olympics in Sydney.

On 18 August 2008, he won the gold medal in men's vault at the Olympics in Beijing, becoming the first Polish Olympic champion in a gymnastics event.

World championships
Blanik won a gold medal in vault at the 2007 World Championships in Stuttgart, earning him an individual berth to the 2008 Beijing Olympics. He also has two World silver medals, from 2002 in Debrecen, and 2005 in Melbourne.

Awards
For his sport achievements, Blanik received: 
 Knight's Cross of the Order of Polonia Restituta (5th Class) in 2008.
 Golden Cross of Merit in 2000.

References

External links
 
 
 Blanik (vault animation)

1977 births
Living people
Polish male artistic gymnasts
Gymnasts at the 2000 Summer Olympics
Gymnasts at the 2008 Summer Olympics
Olympic bronze medalists for Poland
Olympic gold medalists for Poland
Olympic gymnasts of Poland
People from Wodzisław Śląski
Medalists at the World Artistic Gymnastics Championships
Olympic medalists in gymnastics
Originators of elements in artistic gymnastics
Medalists at the 2008 Summer Olympics
Sportspeople from Silesian Voivodeship
Medalists at the 2000 Summer Olympics
European champions in gymnastics
Sasuke (TV series) contestants